Jonathan Joseph may refer to:

 DJ Spoony (born 1970), stage name for British DJ Johnathan Joseph
 Johnathan Joseph (born 1984), American football player
 Jonathan Joseph (rugby union) (born 1991), English rugby union player

See also
 Jonathan ben Joseph, Lithuanian rabbi and astronomer